Mountain Biking UK (often shortened to MBUK) is a British mountain biking magazine. It is published by Our Media, an Immediate Media group company, and is currently the UK's best-selling mountain bike magazine, with a circulation of 23,322 (ABC: Jan – Dec 2021).

History and profile
MBUK was launched in 1988 by Pacificon Limited. It was edited by Tym Manley, who remained editor at large until 2009. Chris Turner, M.D. and Publisher, sold the title to Chris Anderson of Future Publishing in 2010 for an undisclosed amount of money, and in 2014, former-owner Future plc sold all its sports and crafts titles to Immediate Media Company, including the MBUK title. In 2021, the cycling titles were moved under the umbrella of the Immediate Media-owned Our Media Ltd. The current editor is James Costley-White. There are currently 13 issues a year, and the magazine has a policy of including regular 'covermount' gifts such as stickers, gloves and socks.

MBUK covers all mountain biking disciplines; trail riding, downhill, cross-country, dirt jumping, trials, freeriding and 4X.

Since 1989, MBUK has carried the cartoon strip, Mint Sauce, which covers the tales of a mountain-biking sheep and his friends.

In July 2006, MBUK released its 200th issue. To mark the occasion, Cèdric Gracia (leading French downhill and 4X racer) was guest editor.

In May 2008, MBUK released its 20th anniversary issue, issue #225. It came with eight free gifts and a fold-out front cover of Steve Peat.

In October 2021, MBUK released its 400th issue.

Team MBUK
Along with co-sponsors such as Nike, Santa Cruz and Fox Racing, the magazine operated a successful professional mountain bike team from the mid-1990s until the mid-2000s, including riders of the calibre of Steve Peat, Scott Beaumont, Rob Warner and Will Longden and competing in the UCI Mountain Bike World Cup.

References

External links

1988 establishments in the United Kingdom
Sports magazines published in the United Kingdom
Cycling magazines published in the United Kingdom
Magazines established in 1988
Mountain biking magazines
Mass media in Bristol